Emanuelle and the Last Cannibals is a 1977 Italian sexploitation cannibal film directed by Joe D'Amato. The film involves photojournalist Emanuelle (Laura Gemser), who encounters a cannibalistic woman bearing a tattoo of an Amazonian tribe in a mental hospital. Along with Professor Mark Lester (Gabriele Tinti), the two travel to the Amazon with a team to discover the source of the long-thought-extinct tribe that still practices cannibalism today.

The film is an entry in the Black Emanuelle series and features elements of cannibal films which had just gained popularity after the release of Ultimo mondo cannibale (1977). D'Amato referred it in an interview as "a reasonable commercial success, especially abroad".

Plot
In a New York City psychiatric ward, photojournalist Emanuelle (Laura Gemser) learns about a girl there who was found in the Amazon rainforest. Emanuelle discovers that she appears to have been raised by the Apiaca, a tribe of cannibals thought to be lost. She contacts Professor Mark Lester (Gabriele Tinti), the curator at the American Museum of Natural History, and persuades him to come with her to the Amazon.

Upon arrival at the Amazon, they are joined by Isabelle Wilkes (Monica Zanchi), the daughter of the organizer of the expedition, and Sister Angela (Annamaria Clementi), who is going upriver to join a mission. Attacked by a snake, Emanuelle is rescued by hunter Donald McKenzie (Donald O'Brien), who joins the group together with his wife Maggie (Nieves Navarro) and their guide Salvatore (Percy Hogan) and informs Sister Angela that her convent has been attacked by what they presume to be cannibals, and that no survivors remain.

The group continues into the jungle, now being watched by natives in hiding. They find a severed head on a stake, and Sister Angela disappears to be found impaled the next morning. Meanwhile, the McKenzies attempt to leave the group in an attempt to find a crashed plane containing diamonds. As they stumble upon the plane, they are attacked by a tribe of cannibals. Donald and Maggie are kidnapped. The rest of the group only arrive in time to see it happen. They attempt to find the cannibal village. Upon their arrival, the cannibals kill Salvatore and capture Isabelle. Mark and Emanuelle manage to escape only to watch the McKenzies being brutally murdered and Isabelle impregnated by the tribe in preparation for sacrifice. To save Isabelle, Emanuelle paints tribal symbols on her body to convince the natives that she is their water goddess, and carries Isabelle away into the water where Mark is waiting in a speedboat. Shot at by the natives with spears, Mark, Emanuelle and Isabelle still manage to escape unharmed.

Cast
 Laura Gemser as Emanuelle
 Gabriele Tinti as Professor Mark Lester
 Nieves Navarro (as Susan Scott) as Maggie McKenzie
 Donald O'Brien as Donald McKenzie
 Percy Hogan as Salvadore
 Mónica Zanchi (as Monica Zanchi) as Isabelle Wilkes
 Annamaria Clementi (as Anne Maria Clementi) as Sister Angela
 Geoffrey Copleston as Wilkes

Production
After the release of the film Ultimo mondo cannibale (1977), the Italian film market was open for a new group of cannibal related films. Among them, was Emanuelle and the Last Cannibals, a film in the Black Emanuelle film series with a story co-written, directed and photographed by Joe D'Amato. D'Amato declared that he was "a real copy-cat", and that since "Deodato's film Ultimo mondo cannibale had been so successful we thought about doing something along the same lines commercially."

Fabrizio De Angelis co-produced this film, along with another D'Amato project, Emanuelle and the White Slave Trade. D'Amato said in an interview "Fabrizio and I had a company called Fulvia Cinematografica with which we had intended to produce other films. Instead, when we finished these two, we went our separate ways."

In contrast to some previous entries in the "Black Emanuelle" series, Emanuelle and the Last Cannibals does not contain hardcore pornography sequences.

In a 1990 interview, D'Amato remembered that the film had been shot for the most part around a lake in the vicinity of Rome, and that the team gathered together all of the Filipinos who lived in Rome, or were there on vacation, and paid them to work on set for a week. Make-up man Fabrizio Sforza remembers the lake as being the Lago di Fogliano. According to Sforza, the shoot lasted two and a half weeks "with effects, extras, violence, love scenes. Incredible!"

Release
Emanuelle and the Last Cannibals was passed by Italian censors on 20 October 1977. The film was released in 1977.

The film was released on home video by Twisted Dreams Home Video and under the title Trap Them and Kill Them by Twilight Video. Both releases have a runtime of 93 minutes.

Reception
From contemporary reviews, David Badder (Monthly Film Bulletin) described the film as "so preposterous as to be almost enjoyable." Badder felt that D'Amato didn't understand his film was unintentionally funny, stating that this idea is "dispelled by [D'Amato's] typically frenetic direction and the solemn tone maintained throughout."

In retrospective reviews, Danny Shipka, author of Perverse Titillation: The Exploitation Cinema of Italy, Spain and France, 1960-1980  described the film as "fairly harmless compared to other cannibal films of the time, with the violence coming in the last 20 minutes." and that the Black Emanuelle series was "pretty much running out of ideas and it definitely shows in this film." Cavett Binion (AllMovie) gave the film a negative review, calling it "merely excruciating tedium punctuated by occasional kinky sex in the first half of the film and cheap, gag-inducing special effects in the second" and that the film was too "gory for softcore fans and too dull for gorehounds, this is basically a film with no target audience whatsoever."

On 5 April 2016, film critic Scout Tafoya of RogerEbert.com included Emanuelle and the Last Cannibals in his video series "The Unloved", where he highlights films which received mixed to negative reviews yet he believes to have artistic value. Describing D'Amato as "the Luchino Visconti of trash" who Roger Ebert would have appreciated, he praised the film for "its egregious excesses, its dimwitted good nature, its commitment to being as happily dumb as possible" and highlighted its positive portrayal of Emanuelle's character and sexuality, as seen when she poses as the tribe's goddess to save Isabelle. Noting its faithfulness to pulp magazine artwork and tropes, Tafoya concludes his assessment by describing the film as "a sweltering collage of beautiful ruin, like D'Amato put everying put everything burning a hole on Italian movie screens into a pan and boiled them into a delicious reduction. The Zack Snyders of the world could take a lesson from D'Amato: feeding our worst selves doesn't have to be a chore. It can be pleasurable".

See also
List of Italian films of 1977

Footnotes

References

External links

Emanuelle and the Last Cannibals at Variety Distribution

Films directed by Joe D'Amato
1977 horror films
1977 films
Cannibal-boom films
Italian sexploitation films
Italian erotic horror films
1970s Italian-language films
Emanuelle
Films set in New York City
Jungle adventure films
Films set in Central America
Films about rape
Films scored by Nico Fidenco
1970s Italian films
1970s French films